Scott Tweedie (born 29 January 1988) is an Australian television and radio host, presenter and producer.

Tweedie is currently in the United States hosting on the E! Network. Previously, Tweedie was a network host for Network 10, hosting the hit music television program The Loop and a reporter on Studio 10 and hosted the children's series Prank Patrol on the former ABC 3 channel.

In September 2022, Tweedie was announced as being the host of the upcoming Australian Idol reboot scheduled for broadcast in 2023, on the Seven Network alongside Ricki Lee Coulter.

Career
Tweedie had originally planned to become a merchant banker, but later decided to become a radio presenter for Nova 106.9 in Brisbane. He graduated from university with a degree in commerce and finance.

ABC 
In 2009, Tweedie became a host on the Australian television children series Prank Patrol, which launched on 4 December via ABC3, a children's digital television channel owned by the Australian Broadcasting Corporation (ABC). Prank Patrol is based on the original Canadian series, in which kids get to play a prank on their chosen targets. Tweedie is assisted by the Ninjas and an expert to help the kids create their prank. In 2011, Tweedie and Kayne Tremills became co-hosts for the Australian version of the medieval-themed physical kids game show Splatalot!, which first aired on 5 November via ABC3. In 2013, Tweedie hosted WAC: World Animal Championships, along with Amberley Lobo, again on ABC3.

Network 10 
In January 2012, Tweedie and Ash London (later Liv Phyland) became co-hosts on the Australian television music program The Loop, which first aired on 28 January via Eleven, a digital television channel owned by Network Ten. The show featured the top 20 downloaded songs on iTunes each week, classic music, new Australian releases, viral videos and trending tweets. Tweedie filmed over 400 episodes. Tweedie has interviewed a number of international artists such as Katy Perry, Avril Lavigne, Matt Damon, Ed Sheeran and Tom Cruise.

In December 2014, Tweedie with co-host Jessica Tovey and roving reporter Alicia Malone commenced a weekly movie show, Movie Juice, airing on One. The first episode aired on Tuesday 16 December 2014.

In November 2016, Tweedie announced that he would be making his acting debut as Derek Meeps with a guest role in Neighbours on 18 November 2016.

In January 2018, Network Ten announced that Tweedie would travel to Africa to host Edge of the Jungle a behind the scenes online series of I'm a Celebrity... Get Me Out of Here!. Tweedie also joined Studio 10 as a reporter.

In 2019, Tweedie hosted Australia's Dancing with the Stars, filling in for host Grant Denyer who was injured at the time.

In November 2019, Tweedie announced his resignation from Network 10 after 8 years with the network, moving onto a new role overseas.

In March 2022, Tweedie returned to Network 10 to temporarily replace Beau Ryan as host of The Amazing Race Australia 6 after some of the crew members tested positive for COVID-19.

E! News 
In December 2019, it was announced that Tweedie was moving to New York to host the early morning program E! News, and Pop of the Morning with Lilliana Vazquez from 6 January 2020. Shaq labelled Tweedie "the worlds sexiest Australian". During the COVID-19 lockdown, Tweedie hosted an Instagram Live series called HappE! Hour in which he made cocktails and interviewed celebrities.

In late 2020, he relocated to Los Angeles after both E! News and Pop of the Morning were axed in New York.

Seven Network 
In September 2022, Tweedie, was announced as the host of the upcoming Australian Idol reboot scheduled for broadcast in 2023, on the Seven Network alongside Ricki Lee Coulter.

Personal life 
Born in Brisbane, Tweedie attended a boys school where he was captain of cross country in his senior year (2005). He lived in Sydney for a number of years and has two older sisters.

Tweedie was in a relationship with model Georgia Berg for a number of years that ended in 2018. Scott was in a relationship with architect Madeleine John, they dated from 2019 until 2021. 

Surfing is something that Tweedie loves and he would go a few days a week whilst living in Australia. Japanese food is Tweedie's favourite, but he also loves junk food in moderation.

When interviewing Kesha, Tweedie asked if she would like to give him a tattoo. She pulled down his pants and drew a penis in permanent marker and surrounded it with glitter.

Filmography

Television

Film

References

1988 births
Living people
Australian music critics
Australian game show hosts
Australian journalists